Desmond Akawor is a diplomat and politician who was Ambassador of Nigeria to South Korea from 24 April 2008 to 6 August 2015. He was appointed Administrator of the Greater Port Harcourt City Development Authority, a position he has held since 12 June 2015. He was the Director-General of the Wike Gubernatorial Campaign Organization.

References

Living people
People from Oyigbo
First Wike Executive Council
Rivers State Peoples Democratic Party politicians
Board members of the Greater Port Harcourt City Development Authority
Ambassadors of Nigeria to South Korea
People associated with the 2015 Rivers State gubernatorial election
Year of birth missing (living people)